The Boudinot–Southard Farmstead is located at 135 North Maple Avenue in Bernards Township of Somerset County, New Jersey. The property was purchased by Elias Boudinot in 1771. Featuring a Colonial Revival farmhouse, it was added to the National Register of Historic Places on December 18, 2009, for its significance in agriculture, architecture, military and politics/government. The  farmstead includes four contributing buildings and two contributing structures. It is also known as the Ross Farm.

History
In 1771, Edward Lewis sold the property to  Elias Boudinot IV (1740–1821), a lawyer from Elizabeth, who then lived at Boxwood Hall. He and his family relocated here in November 1776 and stayed until November 1783. During the American Revolutionary War, Boudinot was the president of the Continental Congress from 1782 to 1783, and after the war was a United States Representative from New Jersey, 1789–1795. In 1785, he sold the property to Henry Southard (1747–1842), who was United States Representative from New Jersey, 1801–1811 and 1815–1821. In 1818, Southard sold the property to George Slater of New York City. In 1952, after several property transfers, Nathaniel E. Burgess sold it to Edmund B. Ross. In 2005, the property was sold to the county for recreation, conservation, and historic preservation purposes.

Description
The farmhouse is a two and one-half story building featuring Colonial Revival style. The bank barn is mid 19th century. The carriage house is likely the same age as the barn. The lower level has a three-stall horse stable and the second floor has been converted to an apartment.

See also
 National Register of Historic Places listings in Somerset County, New Jersey
 List of the oldest buildings in New Jersey

References

External links
 

Bernards Township, New Jersey
Colonial Revival architecture in New Jersey
National Register of Historic Places in Somerset County, New Jersey
Farms on the National Register of Historic Places in New Jersey
New Jersey Register of Historic Places
Homes of United States Founding Fathers